William Gladstone Mellor (3 April 1886 — 21 July 1938) was an English footballer who played as a goalkeeper.

Career
Mellor began his sporting career in rugby league, playing for Barrow. In 1908, Mellor made the switch to football, signing for Carlisle United. In 1910, Mellor joined Norwich City. In January 1914, Mellor signed for Newcastle United for a fee of £765. At Newcastle, Mellor made 25 appearances in all competitions, appearing 23 times in the First Division.

Later life and death
Mellor late emigrated to New Zealand in 1924, before returning to England six years later. On 21 July 1938, Mellor died in Barrow-in-Furness.

References

1886 births
1938 deaths
Association football goalkeepers
Barrow Raiders players
Carlisle United F.C. players
English expatriate sportspeople in New Zealand
English Football League players
English footballers
English rugby league players
Footballers from Stockport
Newcastle United F.C. players
Norwich City F.C. players
Rugby league players from Greater Manchester